Colonel Henry Hervey Aston (1759 – 23 December 1798) was an English cricketer who played for the Hambledon Club.  He was at different times a member of both the Hambledon Club and Marylebone Cricket Club (MCC).  A useful batsman, Aston made 13 known first-class appearances from 1786 to 1793 when his military duties took precedence.

In December 1793, Aston obtained a Lieutenant-colonelcy in the 12th Foot. Afterwards, he went to Madras, where, in 1798,he fought a duel with Major Picton.  Both fired into the air.  The next day, in another duel, he was wounded by a new adversary, Major Allen. After languishing for about a week, Aston died on 23 December 1798.

Family
Aston married Hon. Harriet Ingram-Shepherd, fourth daughter of Charles Ingram, 9th Viscount of Irvine and his wife Frances Shepherd, of Temple Newsam near Leeds, on 16 September 1789. They had two sons, Henry Charles Hervey-Aston and Sir Arthur Ingram Aston, and a daughter, Harriet, who married Lieut.-Col. Edmund Henry Bridgeman.

References 

 G B Buckley, Fresh Light on 18th Century Cricket, Cotterell, 1935
 Arthur Haygarth, Scores & Biographies, Volume 1 (1744-1826), Lillywhite, 1862
 H T Waghorn, The Dawn of Cricket, Electric Press, 1906

External links
 Henry Hervey Aston at the Eighteenth-Century Poetry Archive (ECPA)

English cricketers
Hampshire cricketers
Hambledon cricketers
Middlesex cricketers
Marylebone Cricket Club cricketers
English cricketers of 1701 to 1786
English cricketers of 1787 to 1825
Suffolk Regiment officers
Duelling fatalities
1759 births
1798 deaths
Deaths by firearm in India
Brighton cricketers
White Conduit Club cricketers